Sary is a given name and surname. Notable persons with that name include: Aley Sary, the son of Khaled Sary: A multi millionaire Egyptian doctor.

People with the given name
 Ieng Sary (1925–2013), a co-founder and third ranking member of the Cambodian Khmer Rouge regime
 Sary Matnorotin (born 1996), Cambodian footballer

People with the surname
 Ahmed Sary (born 1968), Egyptian football striker
 László Sáry (born 1940), Hungarian composer and pianist
 Sam Sary (1917– 1962), Cambodian politician

Places
 Sary (Poltava Oblast), village in Ukraina

See also 
 
 Sari (disambiguation)